The Physiologus is a didactic Christian text written or compiled in Greek by an unknown author, in Alexandria; its composition has been traditionally dated to the 2nd century AD by readers who saw parallels with writings of Clement of Alexandria, who is asserted to have known the text, though Alan Scott has made a case for a date at the end of the 3rd or in the 4th century.  The Physiologus consists of descriptions of animals, birds, and fantastic creatures, sometimes stones and plants, provided with moral content. Each animal is described, and an anecdote follows, from which the moral and symbolic qualities of the animal are derived.  Manuscripts are often, but not always, given illustrations, often lavish.

The book was translated into Armenian in 5th century, into Latin by the early 6th century or possibly even by the mid-4th century and into Ethiopic and Syriac, then into many European and Middle-Eastern languages, and many illuminated manuscript copies such as the Bern Physiologus survive.  It retained its influence over ideas of the "meaning" of animals in Europe for over a thousand years.  It was a predecessor of bestiaries (books of beasts). Medieval poetical literature is full of allusions that can be traced to the Physiologus tradition; the text also exerted great influence on the symbolism of medieval ecclesiastical art: symbols like those of the phoenix rising from its ashes and the pelican feeding her young with her own blood are still well-known.

Allegorical stories
The story is told of the lion whose cubs are born dead and receive life when the old lion breathes upon them, and of the phoenix which burns itself to death and rises on the third day from the ashes; both are taken as types of Christ. The unicorn also which only permits itself to be captured in the lap of a pure virgin is a type of the Incarnation; the pelican that sheds its own blood in order to sprinkle its dead young, so that they may live again, is a type of the salvation of mankind by the death of Christ on the Cross.

Some allegories set forth the deceptive enticements of the Devil and his defeat by Christ; others present qualities as examples to be imitated or avoided.

Attributions
The conventional title Physiologus was because the author introduces his stories from natural history with the phrase: "the physiologus says", that is, "the naturalist says", "the natural philosophers, the authorities for natural history say", a term derived from Greek φύσις (physis, "nature") and λόγος (logos, “word”).

In later centuries it was ascribed to various celebrated Fathers, especially Epiphanius, Basil of Caesarea, and St. Peter of Alexandria. 

The assertion that the method of the Physiologus presupposes the allegorical exegesis developed by Origen is not correct; the so-called Letter of Barnabas offers, before Origen, a sufficient model, not only for the general character of the Physiologus but also for many of its details. It can hardly be asserted that the later recensions, in which the Greek text has been preserved, present even in the best and oldest manuscripts a perfectly reliable transcription of the original, especially as this was an anonymous and popular treatise.

Early history
About the year 400 the Physiologus was translated into Latin; from Greek, the original language that it was written in. In the 5th century into Ethiopic [edited by Fritz Hommel with a German translation (Leipzig, 1877), revised German translation in Romanische Forschungen, V, 13-36]; into Armenian [edited by Pitra in Spicilegium Solesmense, III, 374–90; French translation by Cahier in Nouveaux Mélanges d'archéologie, d'histoire et de littérature (Paris, 1874)] (see also the recent edition: Gohar Muradyan, Physiologus. The Greek And Armenian Versions With a Study of Translation Technique, Leuven–Dudley MA: Peeters, 2005 [Hebrew University Armenian Studies 6]); into Syriac [edited by Tychsen, Physiologus Syrus (Rostock, 1795), a later Syriac and an Arabic version edited by Land in Anecdota Syriaca, IV (Leyden, 1875)]. An Old Slavic (Old Bulgarian) translation was made in the 10th century [edited by Karneyev, Sankt Peterburg, 1890].

Epiphanius used Physiologus in his Panarion and from his time numerous further quotations and references to the Physiologus in the Greek and the Latin Church fathers show that it was one of the most generally known works of Christian Late Antiquity. Various translations and revisions were current in the Middle Ages. The earliest translation into Latin was followed by various recensions, among them the Sayings of St. John Chrysostom on the natures of beasts, A metrical Latin Physiologus was written in the 11th century by a certain Theobaldus, and printed by Morris in An Old English Miscellany (1872), 201 sqq.; it also appears among the works of Hildebertus Cenomanensis in Pat.Lat., CLXXI, 1217–24. To these should be added the literature of the bestiaries, in which the material of the Physiologus was used; the Tractatus de bestiis et alius rebus, often misattributed to Hugo of St. Victor, and the Speculum naturale of Vincent of Beauvais.

Translations
The Physiologus had an impact on neighboring literatures: medieval translations into Latin, Armenian, Georgian, Slavic, Syriac, Coptic, and Ethiopic are known.

Translations and adaptations from the Latin introduced the "Physiologus" into almost all the languages of Western Europe. An Old High German (Alemannic) translation was written in Hirsau in c. 1070 (ed.  Müllenhoff and Scherer in Denkmäler deutscher Poesie und Prosa  No. LXXXI); a later translation (12th century) has been edited by Lauchert in Geschichte des Physiologus (pp. 280–99); and a rhymed version appears in Karajan, Deutsche Sprachdenkmale des XII. Jahrhunderts (pp. 73–106), both based on the Latin text known as Dicta Chrysostomi. Fragments of a 9th-century metrical Anglo-Saxon Physiologus are extant (ed.  Thorpe in Codex Exoniensis  pp. 335–67,  Grein in Bibliothek der angelsächsischen Poesie I, 223-8).

About the middle of the 13th century there appeared a Middle English metrical Bestiary, an adaptation of the Latin Physiologus Theobaldi; this has been edited by Wright and Halliwell in Reliquiæ antiquæ (I, 208-27), also by Morris in An Old English Miscellany (1-25). There is an Icelandic Physiologus preserved in two fragmentary redactions from around 1200.

An adaptation is found in the old Waldensian literature, and has been edited by Alfons Mayer in Romanische Forschungen (V, 392 sqq.). As to the Italian bestiaries, a Tuscan-Venetian Bestiarius has been edited (Goldstaub and Wendriner, Ein tosco-venezianischer Bestiarius, Halle, 1892). Extracts from the Physiologus in Provençal have been edited by Bartsch, Provenzalisches Lesebuch (162-66). The Physiologus survived in the literatures of Eastern Europe in books on animals written in Middle Greek, among the Slavs to whom it came from the Byzantine (translations of the so-called Byzantinian redaction were made in Middle Bulgarian in the 13th-14th century; they were edited in 2011 by Ana Stoykova in an electronic edition, see reference), and in a Romanian translation from a Slavic original (edited by Moses Gaster with an Italian translation in Archivio glottologico italiano, X, 273-304).

The manuscript tradition
Modern study of Physiologus can be said to have begun with Francesco Sbordone's edition, 1936, which established three traditions in the surviving manuscripts of the text, a "primitive" tradition, a Byzantine one and a pseudo-Basil tradition. Ben Perry showed that a manuscript Sbordone had missed, at the Morgan Library, was the oldest extant Greek version, a late 10th-century manuscript from Grottaferrata. Anna Dorofeeva has argued that the numerous early Latin Physiologus manuscripts can be seen as evidence for an 'encyclopedic drive' amongst early medieval monastic writing centres.

Contents

See also

 List of illuminated manuscripts
 Naturalis Historia

Notes

References

 Cahier and Martin, Mélanges d'archaeologie, &c. ii. 85 seq (Paris, 1851), iii. 203 seq. (1853),iv. 55 seq. (r856);
 Cahier, Nouveaux mélanges (1874), p. 106 seq.
 J. Victor Carus, Gesch der Zoologie (Munich, 1872), p. 109 seq.
 Classici auctores I ed. Mai, vii. 585596 (Rome, 1835)
 Michael J. Curley, Introduction, Physiologus. Translated by Michael J. Curley. (Austin: University of Texas Press, 1979). ix-xliii.
 Dahlerup, Verner: "Physiologus i to islandske Bearbejdelser". In: Aarbøger for nordisk Oldkyndighed og Historie (ANOH) 1889, pp. 199–290.
 S. Epiphanius ad physiologum, ed. Ponce de Leon (with woodcuts) (Rome, 1587) another edition, with copper-plates (Antwerp, 1588);
 S. Eustathu ni hexahemeron commentarius, ed. Leo Allatius (Lyons, 1629; cf. I-F van Herwerden, Exerciti. Crstt., pp. 180182, Hague, 1862);
 G. Heider, in Archiv für Kunde österreichischer Geschichtsquellen" (5, 541–82, Vienna, 1850)
 A. Karneyev,  (Sankt Peterburg, 1890).
 J. P. N. Land, Anecdote syriaca (Leiden, 1874), iv. 31 seq., 115 seq., and in Verslager en Mededeelingen der kon. Akad. van Wetenschappen, 2nd series vol. iv. (Amsterdam, 1874);
 Friedrich Lauchert, Geschichten des Physiologus (Strassburg, 1889)
 S. Lazaris, Le Physiologus grec, t. 1. La réécriture de l'histoire naturelle antique (Firenze, 2016, Micrologus Library 77) -  pdf:
 Stavros Lazaris: ″Quelques considérations sur l'illustration du Physiologus grec″, in: Bestiaires médiévaux : Nouvelles perspectives sur les manuscrits et les traditions textuelles. Actes du XVe colloque international de la Société Internationale Renardienne, Louvain-la-Neuve, 18-22 août 2003, B. Van den Abeele (ed.), Louvain-la-Neuve, 2005 (Textes, études, congrès 21), p. 141-167 |pdf : https://www.academia.edu/795328/_Quelques_considérations_sur_l_illustration_du_Physiologus_grec_
 Maetzner, Altengl. Sprachproben (Berlin, 1867), vol. i. pt. i. p. 55 seq.
 Guy R. Mermier, "The Romanian Bestiary: An English Translation and Commentary on the Ancient 'Physiologus' Tradition," Mediterranean Studies, Vol. 13 (Penn State University Press: 2004), pp. 17–55.
 Emil Peters: Der griechische Physiologus und seine orientalischen Übersetzungen (Festschriften der Gesellschaft für deutsche Philologie ; 15). Berlin, 1898.
 B. Pitra, Spicilegium solesmense Th xlvii. seq., 338 seq., 416, 535 (Paris, 1855)
 Meinolf Schumacher: "Der Biber – ein Asket? Zu einem metaphorischen Motiv aus Fabel und 'Physiologus'": Euphorion 86 (1992) pp. 347–353 (PDF)
 Ana Stoykova, The Slavic Physiologus of the Byzantine Recension: Electronic Text Edition and Comparative Study, 2011
 O. G. Tychsen Physiologus syrus, (Rostock, 1795)

Translations 
 Francis Carmody. Physiologus, The Very Ancient Book of Beasts, Plants and Stones. San Francisco: The Book Club of California, 1953.
 A. S. Cook. The Old English Physiologus. Yale Studies in English, vol. 63. New Haven: Yale University Press, 1921.
 Michael J. Curley: Physiologus. Austin: University of Texas Press, 1979. First translation into English of the Latin versions of Physiologus as established by Francis Carmody.
 Emil Peters: Der Physiologus (aus dem griech. Orig., mit einem Nachw. vers. von Friedrich Würzbach). München: Musarionverl., 1921
 Christian Schröder: Der Millstätter Physiologus. Text, Übersetzung, Kommentar (Würzburger Beiträge zur deutschen Philologie ; 24; zugl.: Würzburg, Univ., Diss., 2004). Würzburg: Königshausen & Neumann, 2005
 T. H. White: The Bestiary: The Book of Beasts New York: G. P. Putnam's Sons, 1954, 4/1960
 French translation : Arnaud Zucker, Physiologos. Le bestiaire des bestiaires. Texte traduit du grec, introduit et commenté par Arnaud Zucker, Jérôme Millon, 2005 (Series Atopia). https://books.google.fr/books?id=Z8hwbgnpr-kC.  

2nd-century books
Bestiaries
Biology books
History of biology
Types of illuminated manuscript
Works of unknown authorship